Hildegarde Hawthorne (September 25, 1871 – December 10, 1952) was an American writer of supernatural and ghost stories, a poet and biographer.

Family 
Born on September 25, 1871, in New York City, Hildegarde Hawthorne was the granddaughter of Nathaniel Hawthorne (1804–1864) and eldest child of Julian Hawthorne (1846–1934) and Minnie Amelung Hawthorne. She lived in Germany, England, and Jamaica as a child.

Career 
At age sixteen Hildegarde began selling articles to the children's magazine St. Nicholas. Her supernatural short story "Perdita," was published in the March 1897 Harper's Magazine. She wrote biographies of Nathaniel Hawthorne, Henry Wadsworth Longfellow, Ralph Waldo Emerson, Henry David Thoreau, Thomas Paine, Matthew Fontaine Maury, and Oliver Wendell Holmes Sr.

Hawthorne also wrote travel narratives, including Old Seaport Towns of New England (1916), Rambles in Old College Towns (1917), Corsica: The Surprising Island (1926), Romantic Cities of California (1939), and Williamsburg, Old and New (1941).

Hawthorne marched in the 1913 women's suffrage parade in New York City. She lived in California in the 1920s and 1930s.

A collection of ghost stories by Hawthorne, The Faded Garden, was published in 1985, edited by Jessica Amanda Salmonson. Her work is sometimes found in anthologies of American women's writing.

Personal life 
Hildegarde Hawthorne married John Milton Oskison in 1920. She died in 1952, aged 81 years, in Danbury, Connecticut.

References

External links
 
Hildegarde Hawthorne at ISFDb
 

A photograph of Hildegarde Hawthorne taken later in life, on Calisphere

1871 births
1952 deaths
American women short story writers
American horror writers
American women poets
American biographers
American women biographers